The Kırka mine is a large boron ore mine located at Eskişehir Province in western Turkey. Kırka represents one of the largest boron reserves in Turkey having an estimated reserve of 750.6 million tonnes of ore grading 28% boron.

References 

Boron mines in Turkey
Eskişehir Province
Seyitgazi District